RD2 may refer to:

 RD2, a generation of the Hyundai Tiburon produced from 1999 to 2001
 RD2, a research department of the Potsdam Institute for Climate Impact Research